Yann Kerr is an electrical engineer with the Centre National d'Etudes Spatiales (CNES) in Toulouse, France. He was named a Fellow of the Institute of Electrical and Electronics Engineers (IEEE) in 2013 for his contributions to two-dimensional L-band microwave interferometer design.

References 

Fellow Members of the IEEE
Living people
Year of birth missing (living people)
Place of birth missing (living people)